Pemberton's Parlour is a structure on the northern part of the Chester city walls, and it was formerly known as the Goblin Tower.  It is recorded in the National Heritage List for England as a designated Grade I listed building.

History
The structure originated as a circular tower straddling the city walls. During the reign of Queen Anne it was rebuilt as a semicircular tower.  It was reconstructed in 1894.  It is now described as a gazebo, and is said to be named after John Pemburton, the mayor of Chester, who stood on it to supervise the work taking place on his nearby ropewalk.

Architecture
The structure is built in red sandstone.  On the south side, facing the walkway of the walls, is an arch leading to a semicircular chamber.  Above this are three panels, the lateral ones containing the royal arms, and the arms of Chester in relief.  Between these is another panel in yellow sandstone with an inscription relating to the repair of the walls in the 18th century.  The parapet is crenellated and inscribed with "GOBLIN TOWER: REBUILT 1894".

See also

Grade I listed buildings in Cheshire West and Chester

References

Buildings and structures in Chester
Grade I listed buildings in Chester